The Pocosin Lakes National Wildlife Refuge is located in North Carolina's Inner Banks on the Albemarle-Pamlico Peninsula in Hyde, Tyrrell, and Washington Counties, North Carolina. Its headquarters is located in Columbia.

Pocosin Lakes NWR was established in 1990. Originally, the  southwestern portion of the refuge, now known as the Pungo Unit, was established in 1963 as the Pungo National Wildlife Refuge, but was merged in 1990 with Pocosin Lakes. The refuge is named for the pocosin peat wetlands that make up the majority of the protected habitat. 
 
This refuge is home to indigenous animals such as the black bear, alligator, two species of fox, bobcat, raccoon, coyote, opossum, beaver, river otter, mink, and red wolf. It was the site chosen for the reintroduction of the endangered red wolf in 1987. It is located along the Atlantic Flyway and is home to more than 200 species of birds. The Pungo Lake unit is a notable overwintering site for Tundra swans, snow geese, and many species of ducks, with about 100,000 waterfowl in residence between November and January.


Ecology and Conservation 
Nearly one-third of the refuge is currently undergoing hydrology restoration.

Past Wildfires 
Two notable wildfires have burned within the Pocosin Lakes NWR since its protection. In April 1985, the Allen Road Fire ignited in the refuge, burning nearly 100,000 acres over three weeks and requiring assistance from the Marines to extinguish the peat 'ground fires' it left in its wake.
 The fire was declared out on January 9, 2009.

History

Indigenous Occupants 
Human presence in the Pocosin Lakes region likely dates back as many as 10,000 years. Though little systematic archaeological investigation of the Pocosin Lakes NWR has been undertaken, the adjacent Phelps Lake was found to contain more than 30 dugout canoes, some as many as 4,400 years old. Indigenous people likely lived nearby, and accounts from early in the refuge's documented history mention the presence of various Native American artifacts on the shores of Pungo Lake. The region was populated by tribes of Algonquian peoples up until the late Woodland period. The word "pocosin" itself comes from an Algonquian language via an uncertain etymology. While tribal organization and boundaries changed rapidly during the era of colonization, as conflict and disease inflicted high mortality rates on indigenous peoples, the Secotan and Machapunga tribes are both recorded in the area. The Machapunga people and Pungo Lake may share name roots; an 1888 account of a group of displaced "Mattamuskeet Indians" in Robeson County reports that they referred to Pungo Lake as Mattapungo.

Colonization and Development 
Following European colonization, the pocosin lakes were quickly modified and developed in an attempt to expand available crop land. In 1840, the state (via its agent "The Literary Board") began a decade-long attempt to drain Pungo Lake in what is now the Pocosin Lakes NWR. A 25-foot-wide canal was excavated by enslaved people, who worked knee-deep in water and were housed in "shanties" along the edges of the canals. Though efforts to drain the lake were eventually abandoned when little usable land was revealed, the canal construction did drop the lake's surface level by at least 5 feet, and the Pungo Lake Canal still extends from the lake to the Pungo River.

Representation in Media and Art 

 Composer Kenneth Frazelle wrote a piece called "“The Swans at Pungo Lake" for the North Carolina Symphony in 2006.

References

External links 
Pocosin Lakes National Wildlife Refuge Home Page
 

National Wildlife Refuges in North Carolina
Protected areas of Hyde County, North Carolina
Protected areas of Tyrrell County, North Carolina
Protected areas of Washington County, North Carolina